Haridwar Singh (born 31 March 1944, Varanasi, Uttar Pradesh, India) was an Indian scientist. He has been director of the High Energy Materials Research Laboratory (HEMRL), Defence Research and Development Organisation (DRDO), Ministry of Defence, from 1990 to 2004.

Dr. Singh died on 4 November 2017.

Biography 

Singh has been a scientist who has researched in the field of energetic materials and development of indigenous technologies for many varieties of solid rocket propellants like DBP (Double Base Propellant), Nitramine base, fuel-rich propellants, propellants based on new oxidizers and energetic binders and technologies for powerful and thermally stable high explosives and pyrotechnic smokes.

He has formulated methodology for life extension of propulsion systems of advanced missiles, which resulted in financial savings for the country.

His contributions include the development of energetic low vulnerability gun propellants, Explosive Reactive Armour (ERA) technology, Fuel Air Explosive (FAE) and Thermo-baric explosive technology and CCCT (Combustible Cartridge Case Technology).

He initiated and monitored many research programs in the area of high energy materials, especially propellants and explosives for rockets, missiles and pyrotechnics. Scientific achievements under his leadership include the development and transfer of technologies of high energy propellants for various applications including propellant technology of a class of LOw Vulnerability Ammunition (LOVA) for tank guns, development of explosive reactive armour, Combustible Cartridge Case Technology, High Explosive compositions for different types of warheads, non-smoky RDX-based propellants for booster and sustainer applications etc.,. He has contributed to Indian research on life extension of propulsion system of missiles.

Singh was a close scientific advisor to the 11th president of India, Dr. APJ Abdul Kalam and several Indian Prime Ministers.

Education

Awards

Patents  

Singh has 18 patents to his credit.

Books authored 

Singh has been the first author of three books:

1. Science & technology of Solid Rocket Propellants, in Hindi.

Singh is the first Indian to have written a book on Rocket Propellants in India's "national language", Hindi.

This book was awarded by the Ministry of Human Resource Development, for original work done in the national language for Science & Technology.

2. Science & technology of Solid Rocket Propellants, in English.

3. High Energy Materials, in English.

Publications in national and international journals 
Singh has authored 181 research publications and 17 technical reports.

National  & International Professional Associations

International  
Germany: The Max-Planck Institute,Visiting Scientist.

U.S.A:  High Pressure Combustion Laboratory, Pennsylvania State University, Visiting Scientist.

Delaware University, Visiting Scientist.

University of Arizona, Visiting Scientist.

United States Army Research Laboratory, Maryland, Visiting Scientist.

Science Application Centre, Santa Clara, Visiting Scientist.

Sandia National Laboratories, Livermore, Visiting Scientist.

American Institute of Aeronautics (AIAA), Lifetime Member.

American Chemical Society (ACS), Lifetime Member.

Russia: Russian Academy of Aeronautics, Honorary Member.

Israel: Dr. Singh received the Lady Davis Fellowship and served as "Visiting Professor" at the Israel Institute of Technology (IIT), Haifa from 2004 to 2010.

China: Nanjing University of Science and Technology, China, Visiting Professor.

Australia: Australian Institute of High Energy Materials. Honorary Member,

National  
India: Chairman of High Energy Material Society of India (HEMSI).

Senate member of University of Pune.

Fellow of the Deccan Education Society.

Member of Science Journal Editorial Executive Board.

Central University, Hyderabad, Visiting Professor.

DIAT, Pune, Visiting Professor.

Dr. Singh was on the Board of Directors of several private sector companies and a consultant in the area of Industrial Chemistry, High Energy Materials & Management.

References

Living people
Scientists from Varanasi
1944 births